Haldenstein railway station is a railway station in the northern part of the municipality of Chur, in the Swiss canton of Grisons. The station is on the Rhaetian Railway's  Landquart–Thusis line. The Swiss Federal Railways Chur–Rorschach line runs parallel but has no intermediate stops between Chur and Landquart. The station serves the municipality of Haldenstein, located on the other side of the River Rhine.

Services
Haldenstein is served by regional trains:

 RegioExpress: hourly service between Disentis/Mustér and Scuol-Tarasp.
 Regio: limited service between Disentis/Mustér and Scuol-Tarasp.

References

External links
 
 

Railway stations in Graubünden
Rhaetian Railway stations
Transport in Chur
Railway stations in Switzerland opened in 1896